The 2015 Pepsi Tankard, the provincial men's curling championship of New Brunswick was held January 28 to February 1 at the Tri County Complex Arena in Fredericton Junction, New Brunswick. The winning Jeremy Mallais team represented New Brunswick at the 2015 Tim Hortons Brier in Calgary.

Teams
The teams are listed as follows:

Round robin standings

Scores

January 28
Draw 1
T. Odishaw 7-4 Kennedy
Mallais 7-4 McCann
G. Odishaw 9-6 Vaughan
Grattan 9-6 Tallon

Draw 2
Vaughan 6-3 McCann
Tallon 10-6 T. Odishaw
Grattan 9-4 Kennedy
Mallais 8-7 G. Odishaw

January 29
Draw 3
Grattan 8-3 G. Odishaw
Vaughan 6-3 Kennedy
Tallon 8-7 Mallais
T. Odishaw 12-5 McCann

Draw 4
Kennedy 7-8 Mallais
T. Odishaw 9-1 G. Odishaw
Grattan 5-4 McCann
Vaughan 5-4 Tallon

January 30
Draw 5
Tallon 5-10 G. Odishaw
Mallais 4-7 Grattan
T. Odishaw 5-6 Vaughan
McCann 7-6 Kennedy

Draw 6
Grattan 5-8 T. Odishaw
Kennedy 10-4 Tallon
G. Odishaw 4-6 McCann
Mallais 5-4 Vaughan

January 31
Draw 7
McCann - Tallon (not played)
Grattan 4-6 Vaughan
Mallais 12-9 T. Odishaw
Kennedy - G. Odishaw (not played)

Playoffs

Semifinal

Final

References

Pepsi Tankard
Curling competitions in New Brunswick
Sunbury County, New Brunswick
Pepsi Tankard
Pepsi Tankard
2015 in New Brunswick